Brandun DeShay (born May 10, 1990), stylized as brandUn DeShay, is an American rapper, songwriter and record producer from Chicago, Illinois. He produced for all of his releases. Aside from his solo career, DeShay was an early member of the Los Angeles-based hip hop collective Odd Future.

Career 
DeShay was one of the early members of the hip hop collective OFWGKTA, appearing on Tyler, The Creator's first solo mixtape effort Bastard, before he decided to branch out on his own in 2010. DeShay has produced for rappers such as Curren$y, Dom Kennedy, Mac Miller, Action Bronson, Chance The Rapper, and Danny Brown. His first official music video, "Why You Gotta Zodiac Like That" has been in rotation on mtvU.

In 2011, he released his fifth mixtape All Day DeShay: AM on his label Seven7Ceven Music. It was well-received by fans and critics. Following the release of the tape, DeShay was nominated for the 2012 XXL Freshman list.

Style and influences 
In an interview with MTV UK, DeShay said that Pharrell Williams and Yasutaka Nakata's music inspired him. He also stated that N.E.R.D, Kanye West, MF DOOM, Lupe Fiasco, A Tribe Called Quest and Lil Wayne were some of his influences initially.

Discography

Studio albums 
 All Day DeShay: AM (2011)
 goldUn child (2015)
 goldUn child 2 (2016)
 PLAY.MAKE.BELIEVE (as Ace Hashimoto) (2021)

Extended plays 
 The Super D3Shay (with The Jet Age of Tomorrow as The Super D3Shay) (2009)

Mixtapes 
 Volume: One! for the Money (2008)
 Volume: Two! for the Show (2009)
 Volume: Three! to Get Ready (2010)

Guest appearances

Songwriting

Production discography

References

External links 

1990 births
Living people
21st-century American rappers
African-American male rappers
American hip hop record producers
Odd Future members
Rappers from Chicago
Record producers from Illinois